The Journal of Southeast Asian Studies is a peer-reviewed academic journal covering scholarly studies on Southeast Asia (Brunei, Cambodia, Indonesia, Laos, Malaysia, Myanmar, the Philippines, East Timor, Singapore, Thailand and Vietnam). It publishes articles from a wide range of disciplines in the humanities and social sciences. The journal's extensive book review section includes works in Southeast Asian languages. From its foundation in 1960 until 1969, it was the Journal of Southeast Asian History.

Abstracting and indexing 
The journal is abstracted and indexed in the International Bibliography of Periodical Literature, International Bibliography of Book Reviews of Scholarly Literature, FRANCIS, Arts and Humanities Citation Index and the Social Sciences Citation Index.

References

External links 
 

Southeast Asian studies journals
Cambridge University Press academic journals
Quarterly journals
English-language journals
National University of Singapore
Publications established in 1960
Academic journals associated with universities and colleges